1944: The Loop Master is a vertical scrolling shooter scrolling arcade game made by Capcom in 2000 that uses a horizontal 4:3 screen. Unlike previous games, the programming for this arcade was done by a separate company called 8ing/Raizing. The game is the fifth of a series of World War II vertical shooters made by Capcom, the 194X series. The game takes place in the heated battles of 1944 during the Second World War as two super ace pilots, P-38 Lightning and Mitsubishi A6M Zero are attempting to defeat an entire army. It is the sequel to 19XX: The War Against Destiny and uses the arcade cabinet CP System II.

Gameplay

The arcade operates and plays like most standard shooters. The objective of every level is to shoot enemy planes, tanks, trains, turrets, battleships, and defeat the boss after each level. Unlike its predecessor, 19XX: The War Against Destiny, the game plays more like the early games in the series. Despite the opening description of the plane stats, both planes operate equally, and are only available to the first or second player respectively. The game borrows from 19XX in that it has a form of charge up system. By holding the fire button down, the charge bar will fill, and when full, the plane will fly up and become temporarily invincible. The game also has the standard bomb button, which causes Tomahawk Missiles to fly up the screen doing major damage to any enemies they hit.

The health system in the game also works unlike the previous games in the series. The plane has a health bar which decreases after every hit. However, players start with only one life, and the game sparingly gives health boosts.

Wingmen
The option of wingmen is much more present in this game than others in the series. A small golden plane icon flies down the screen at certain times which releases a wingmen icon.  Wingmen add some extra firepower, but are vulnerable to enemy fire.

Beginning with stage 8, wingmen fire laser shots.

Stages
There are 15 stages in this game.

As an arcade board option, Stage select allows the player to start the game at stage 1, 6, or 11. If stage layout is set to endless, the player can also choose round number 1, 2, or 3, with a higher round being more difficult.

During any boss battle, there is an invisible time limit for each battle. The mission is failed when there is at least one core among all boss units are not destroyed within the time limit. Mission failure does not change game progress, but it prevents the player from getting the stage clear bonus.
Bosses include Nagi, a high speed destroyer, Akane, a prototype attacker, and Kai, an anti-submarine battle cruiser. After destroying the stage 15 boss Appare Toride, the game ends if the stage layout is set to 1 loop, or the game continues to stage 1 with enemies firing more rapidly if the stage layout is set to endless.

Release 
In February 2021, it was included as part of pack 3 in the Capcom Arcade Stadium compilation for Nintendo Switch.

Reception 
In Japan, Game Machine listed 1944: The Loop Master on their November 15, 2000 issue as being the thirteenth most-successful arcade game of the month.

References

External links
GameFAQs

2000 video games
Arcade video games
Capcom games
CP System II games
Eighting games
Anti-war video games
Vertically scrolling shooters
Video games developed in Japan
World War II video games
Cooperative video games
Video games set in 1944
Multiplayer and single-player video games